Hosea Ballou II (October 18, 1796May 27, 1861) was an American Universalist minister and the first president of Tufts University from 1853 to 1861. Ballou was named after his uncle and went by the name "Hosea Ballou 2d. " Publishers, friends, editors, Tufts University staff, and others generally followed this example. The title of this article reflects the more recent generational suffix usage of the Roman numeral II for those named for an uncle. Ballou used the ordinal number suffix "2d" rather than "2nd."

Life and career
Ballou was born in Halifax, Vermont.  He was the son of Asahel Ballou and Martha Starr, a descendant of Comfort Starr, one of the original incorporators of Harvard College. Hosea Ballou II was also the grand-nephew of Hosea Ballou, and was associated with him in editing The Universalist Quarterly Review.  He married Clarissa Hatch in 1820, and they had seven children.

Ballou promoted the establishment of seminaries for religious training, something which was at that time opposed by a number of influential Universalists including his uncle Hosea.  He edited or wrote for a number of Universalist publications.  In 1843, he replaced Ellery Channing as a member of the Harvard Board of Overseers, and retained this position until 1858.

Writings
 The Ancient History of Universalism, from the Time of the Apostles to the Fifth General Council (1829)
 A Collection of Psalms and Hymns for the Use of Universalist Societies and Families (1837)
 "Review of the Denomination of Universalists in the United States," Universalist Expositor (1839)
 Counsel and Encouragement: Discourses on the Conduct of Life (1866)

References
Notes

Bibliography

Further reading
 
 Alan Seaburg. The First Universalist Church of Medford, Massachusetts. Billerica: Anne Miniver Press, 2013

External links
The papers of Hosea Ballou are in the Harvard Divinity School Library at Harvard Divinity School in Cambridge, Massachusetts.

1796 births
1861 deaths
18th-century Christian universalists
19th-century Christian universalists
Clergy of the Universalist Church of America
Presidents of Tufts University
19th-century American clergy